NCC Education Ltd. is a global provider and awarding body of English education. The company provides students with the opportunity to earn internationally recognised British qualifications by studying at one of its Accredited Partner Centres, either through the classroom or online.

History
Originally part of the National Computing Centre, NCC Education was initially established as an IT initiative by the British Government in 1966. NCC Education started offering IT qualifications in 1976 and from 1997 developed its Higher Education portfolio to include Business programmes and a range of foundation programmes. Since early 2002, NCC Education has offered Information Communication Technology (ICT) programmes for schools.

Today
Today, NCC Education has an extensive network of Accredited Partner Centres in over 50 countries, international offices situated in the UK (Manchester), China (Beijing), Malaysia (Kuala Lumpur), Singapore, and South Africa (Cape Town), and employs academic managers worldwide. NCC Education is accredited by The Qualifications and Curriculum Authority (QCA) and regulated by Ofqual. Recognised by the Department for Business, Innovation and Skills (DBIS) in the UK.

The company's qualifications are articulated by a number of UK universities or for entry into years one, two, and three of specific degree programmes. NCC Education works in close partnership with the University of Central Lancashire (UCLan) and the University of Greenwich.

References

Computer science education in the United Kingdom
Education in Manchester
Education in the United Kingdom
Organisations based in Manchester
Organizations established in 1997
Qualification awarding bodies in the United Kingdom
Science and technology in Greater Manchester
1997 establishments in the United Kingdom